Minna Wetlesen (née Annette Wilhelmine Bülow; January 18, 1821 – March 14, 1891) was a pioneer Norwegian educator, teacher and author.

Biography
Annette Wilhelmine Bülow was born at Drammen in Buskerud, Norway. She was the daughter of Danish-born naval officer Ludwig Wilhelm von Bülow (1790-1834). and Anette Sophie Edel von Bülow  (1789-1872). Her parents were member of the Danish noble Bülow family. After the death of her father, she and her mother moved  to Copenhagen. In 1845, she married Frederik Wetlesen (1815-1890) who taught at the agricultural school founded by his father, Michael von Zenthe Wetlesen.

In 1865, she and her husband started Minna og Frederik Husgjerningsskole, a school for young farm girls situated at the historic farm Abildsø (Abildsø gård) in Aker, east of Christiania (now Oslo). This was the first such school in Norway. The school offered classes in mathematics and the Norwegian language as well as home economics, cooking, care of livestock and processing of farm products. In 1890, she published her  popular cookbook for young housewives,   Husholdningsbog for unge Husmødre i By og Bygd (Kristiania. 1890).

References

Related reading
Husgjerningsskolen på Abildsø - Europas første husmorskole (Erik Henning Edvardsen)

External links
Abildsø gård website

1821 births
1891 deaths
People from Drammen
Norwegian educators
Norwegian writers
Norwegian non-fiction writers
Norwegian women non-fiction writers
19th-century Norwegian writers
19th-century Norwegian educators